Parornix incerta is a moth of the family Gracillariidae. It is known from Spain.

References

Parornix
Moths of Europe
Moths described in 1982